Irish Bayou is a community along a body of water of the same name within the legal boundaries of the city of New Orleans, Louisiana, but separated from the rest of the city by undeveloped wetlands.  It falls within a group of communities collectively known as Eastern New Orleans.  It is located at latitude 30°08'30", longitude 89°51'50", with an average elevation of 1 meter. It is primarily a sport fishing community with few permanent residents.

The Irish Bayou Castle (AKA. Fisherman's Castle), depicted at right was built in 1981 in preparation for the 1984 Louisiana world exposition, although the castle is now owned and used by Charles and Jean Khul as a hunting and fishing camp.

The origin of the community of Irish Bayou is obscure.

In Popular Culture

The area is briefly mentioned in the 1973 James Bond film Live and Let Die during a boat chase.

References

Populated places in Louisiana